Good Game is an American comedy series, developed by Michele Morrow and Jesse Cox, that premiered on August 30, 2017 on YouTube Red. In March 2018, it was announced that the show had been cancelled after one season due to low viewership, despite receiving mostly favorable reviews.

Premise
Good Game follows "a newly formed team of eSports players trying to make it to the top in the cutthroat world of competitive gaming."

Cast and characters
 Dan Avidan as Alex Taylor, the optimistic coach of the team and Ryland's roommate
 Arin Hanson as Ryland Tate, a former DotA legend who tries to hide his embarrassing past
 Michele Morrow as Ashley "Ash" Donovan, a video game reporter who relishes the chance to compete
 Jade Payton as Samantha "Sam" Kinsey, a former Olympic tennis hopeful who began playing Killcore during rehabilitation from an injury
 Rahul Abburi as Kamal Pasala, an obnoxious but vital part of the team.
 Michael Ornstein as Lorenzo Santella Jr., Alex and Ryland's landlord and source of the team's funding
 Oliver Cooper as "SteaminSemen", Ryland's adversary
 Jesse Cox as Jesse Newman, the mysterious creator of Killcore

Production

Development
On June 22, 2017, it was announced during YouTube Red's presentation at VidCon that they had given the production a series order. The series was developed by Michele Morrow and Jesse Cox, executive produced by Dan Harmon, and expected to be showrun by Sarah Carbiener and Erica Rosbe. Production companies involved with the series were expected to consist of Starburns Industries.

Cancellation
On March 25, 2018, Morrow announced through her official Twitter account that the show had been cancelled after one season due to low viewership.

Casting
Alongside the initial series announcement, it was confirmed that the series would star Arin Hanson, Dan Avidan, and Michele Morrow.

Release
On August 3, 2017, the official trailer for the series was released.

Episodes

Reception
In a positive review, Heavys Jack Fennimore commended the series saying, "Good Game so far has me impressed. This was clearly a show made by game players, for game players, which is a rarity in most entertainment media. It also made me care about my YouTube Red subscription. And if you have a subscription, I definitely recommend checking the show out. It's going in a good direction and I can’t wait to see what happens to eSports People." In another favorable critique, Fandoms Drew Dietsch praised the series saying, "The plot itself is a little threadbare, but it clearly gives Arin and Dan a chance to showcase their unique comedic chops. Game Grumps is known for its off-the-cuff ridiculousness, so it’s great that energy has been channeled into something structured. Creators Jesse Cox and Michele Morrow have done an excellent job in having their stars fit the material." In a more mixed assessment, Cultured Vultures Katrina Bertz described the series as "a poorly-crafted show with a profound message of individual happiness within. I would suggest watching this show with the knowledge that it won’t be good, but its theme will tug at your heartstrings. Just try to overcome your initial confusion and discover something wonderful."

References

External links
 

2010s YouTube series
2017 esports television series
2017 web series debuts
2017 web series endings
Game Grumps
American comedy web series
YouTube Premium original series